The 2023 Arctic Winter Games was a winter multi-sport event which took place in the Regional Municipality of Wood Buffalo in Northern Alberta from 29 January to 4 February 2023. The games were originally scheduled to take place in March 2022, but was rescheduled due to the COVID-19 pandemic.

The Arctic Winter Games is the world's largest multisport and cultural event for young people of the Arctic. The Games is an international biennial celebration of circumpolar sports and culture held for a week, each time with a different nation or region as the host. AWG celebrates sports, social interaction and culture. The Games contributes to creating an awareness on cultural diversity, and develops athletes to participate in the competitions with the focus on fair play. The games bind the Arctic countries together and include traditional games such as Arctic sports and Dené games.

Organization
The 2023 games are set to take place in Wood Buffalo in Northern Alberta, Canada. Nicole Clow is the general manager of the games.

Marketing
The mascot of the 2023 games is a lynx named Nitotem. The name translates to "my friend" in the Cree language. The mascot was designed by Sadie Antoine from Fort McMurray, after she won a design contest.

Participants
Eight contingents are set to participate in the 2023 Arctic Winter Games.
 Alaska, United States 
 Greenland
 Northern Alberta, Canada (host)
 Northwest Territories, Canada
 Nunavik, Quebec, Canada
 Nunavut, Canada
 Sámi people
 Yukon, Canada
Athletes from the Russian region of Yamalo-Nenets will not be participating in the 2023 Arctic Winter Games due to the 2022 Russian invasion of Ukraine.

Venues
The 2023 are to be held at various sports venues, schools and facilities in Fort McMurray, Anzac and Fort McKay.

Sports venues

The following venues are set to host events during the 2023 Arctic Winter Games.

The Games

Sports
Twenty sports are scheduled to be held at the 2023 Arctic Winter Games. Archery will make its debut in the modern games, having appeared only once before in the 1974 Arctic Winter Games. Alpine skiing will return to the games after not appearing in 2018. Dog mushing has been removed from the program and will not appear. Four skiing sports are to be held, with alpine skiing, biathlon, cross-country skiing and snowboarding. Two snowshoe events are to be held, with snowshoe biathlon and snowshoeing. Two racquet sports are to be held, with badminton and table tennis. Two skating events are to be held, with figure skating and short track speed skating. Team sports to be held are basketball, futsal, ice hockey, volleyball and curling. Traditional Inuit sports are also held, with Arctic sports, Dene games, and wrestling, the latter also including events for traditional wrestling. Also scheduled are gymnastics and archery.

Medal tally

Culture 
The Arctic Winter Games celebrates culture and creates in the participants an awareness of cultural similarities and dissimilarities. Cultural exchange and social interaction are important parts of the Games. Each participating contingent contributes with performances in dance, song, music, plays or art. These cultural events reflect the traditional as well as the modern cultures of the Arctic.

Hodgson Trophy
At each Arctic Winter Games, the AWG International Committee presents the Hodgson Trophy to the contingent whose athletes best exemplify the ideals of fair play and team spirit. Team members also receive a distinctive pin in recognition of their accomplishment.

Medallists

Archery

Arctic sports
2005

Open

Badminton

Basketball

Curling

Dene games
Boys

Girls

Gymnastics

Ice hockey

Volleyball

Wrestling
Individual

Inuit wrestling

Team

References

External links
2023 Arctic Winter Games Official Site
Arctic Winter Games Official Site

 
 

Arctic Winter Games, 2023
2023 in Canadian sports
2023
Multi-sport events in Canada
International sports competitions hosted by Canada
Regional Municipality of Wood Buffalo
Arctic Winter Games
Arctic Winter Games
Arctic Winter Games
2023 in Alberta
Arctic Winter Games